Dr. Margot Arce de Vázquez (March 10, 1904 – November 14, 1990) was a writer, essayist and educator who founded the Puerto Rican Academy of the Spanish Language.

Early years
Arce de Vázquez was born and raised in Caguas, Puerto Rico, where she received her primary and secondary education. In 1922, she graduated from that city's Central High School and following her graduation enrolled in the University of Puerto Rico in Río Piedras, San Juan.

As a university student she sympathized with the Puerto Rican Nationalist Party and became involved in the independence movement of the island. She was also the editor of the university's newspaper where she often expressed her views. After she majored and earned her bachelor's degree in mathematics and Spanish she went to Spain and enrolled in the Central University of Madrid. Among her educators were the essayist Américo Castro and the poet Dámaso Alonso. Their teachings influenced Arce de Vázquez for the rest of her life. In 1930, she earned her doctorate in philosophy and letters. Her thesis was about Garcilaso de la Vega, a work which she would publish later in her life.

Educator
When Arce de Vázquez returned to Puerto Rico, she was hired by her alma mater. She founded the Department of Hispanic Studies and was its director from 1943 to 1965. Among the distinguished Puerto Ricans she influenced were Luis de Arrigoitia, Mariano Feliciano, José Ferrer Canales and Rosario Ferré. In 1953, she helped organize and presided over the committee in charge of transferring the body of Puerto Rican poet Julia de Burgos from New York City to the island. In 1955, Arce de Vázquez founded the Puerto Rican Academy of the Spanish Language. During her spare time she wrote essays expressing her pro-independence views, which were published in many of the island's magazines and newspapers.

Author
Arce de Vázquez edited the works of Puerto Rican poet Luis Palés Matos. Two of her most important works were: Notas Puertorriqueñas (1950) (Puerto Rican Notes) and Gabriela Mistral, persona y poesía (1958) (Gabriela Mistral: The Poet and her Work). These works were highly acclaimed and received awards from the Puerto Rican Institute of Literature.

Written works
 Literatura puertorriqueña
 Obras Completas De Margot Arce De Vázquez
 Gabriela Mistral: The Poet and Her Work
 Lecturas Puertorriqueñas: Prosa (Puerto Rico: Realidad y Anhelo, Número 2), by Mariana Robles de Cardona, Margot Arce de Vázquez (Editor)

Final years
The Puerto Rican Academy of the Spanish Language bestowed upon Arce de Vázquez the title of "Profesora Emeritus" upon her retirement in 1970. Dr. Margot Arce de Vázquez died on November 14, 1990 in Hato Rey, Puerto Rico from Alzheimer's disease. She was buried at the Puerto Rico Memorial Cemetery in Carolina, Puerto Rico.

In memory
In 1996, the Río Piedras Rotary Club dedicated the 50th anniversary issue of their magazine Asomante to the memory of Arce de Vázquez and to Nilita Vientos Gastón. Also in 1996, the Central University of Bayamón honored her memory by renaming their library after her.

See also

List of Puerto Ricans
Puerto Rican Nationalist Party

References

1904 births
1990 deaths
Deaths from Alzheimer's disease
Neurological disease deaths in Puerto Rico
People from Caguas, Puerto Rico
Puerto Rican educators
Puerto Rican non-fiction writers
Latin Americanists
Members of the Puerto Rican Nationalist Party
Puerto Rican activists
Puerto Rican independence activists
Puerto Rican nationalists